Dyscord were an Australian metalcore band from Perth. In 2006 they released their debut extended play, Arming Within, through independent label Prime Cuts and toured Australia supporting international bands, God Forbid and The Black Dahlia Murder.

In 2008 they released their debut full-length album, Dakota, produced by Adam Spark (of Birds of Tokyo) at Wing Command Studios. Dakota was positively received in critical reviews and was toured nationally both on an independent headlining tour and alongside Tennessee's Whitechapel and Tasmania's Psycroptic.

They have supported international groups, Machine Head, Carcass, Arch Enemy, Trivium, Killswitch Engage, Unearth, As I Lay Dying, the Haunted, Mudvayne, Ill Niño, Static-X, Darkest Hour, as well as Australian bands, Parkway Drive, I Killed the Prom Queen, Double Dragon and Truth Corroded. They released their second album, Tirades, in February 2010 via Stomp Entertainment and followed with a tour into March. Anna Denejkina of VoltageMedia opined, "[it] is without doubt the album that is going to bring [the group] worldwide recognition. With a sound that is all their own, [they] fuse elements of Death Metal, Thrash, Grind and even Melodic metal into one brutal metal melting pot to pull out a sound that is uniquely 'Dyscord'." Soon after the tour, Dyscord disbanded to focus on other projects.

Members

 James Herbert - vocals
 Matthew Herbert - guitars
 Owen Thomas - guitars
 Raffe Houston - bass
 Ashley Large - drums
 Tim Madden - drums
 John Chuah - guitar
 John Blythman - drums
 Ben Hesketh - drums

Discography

Albums 

 Dakota (7 April 2008): – Independent/MGM Distribution (PC020)
 Tirades (9 February 2010): – Stomp Records (STMPCD043)

Extended plays 

 Arming Within (2006): – Independent

Compilations 

 2007 - A Blaze in the Southern Skies

References

External links
  archived from the original on 7 February 2011. Accessed on 28 January 2018.

Western Australian musical groups
Musical groups established in 2002
2002 establishments in Australia